The International Accreditation Agency for Online Universities (IAAOU) is a self-styled "accreditation" board based in the United States. It has no status with the United States Department of Education (USDE) or the Council for Higher Education Accreditation (CHEA). Without USDE and CHEA recognition, its "accreditations" are essentially meaningless.

The Texas Higher Education Coordinating Board has indicated that Rochville University and Belford University, and the agencies from which they claim accreditation, "appear to be operated by the same people".

Schools claiming IAAOU accreditation
Ashwood University
Belford University (not to be confused with the University of Bedford which is linked to University Degree Program, another diploma mill)
Belford High School

See also
 Accreditation mill
 Diploma mill
 List of unaccredited institutions of higher learning
 List of unrecognized accreditation associations of higher learning

References

External links
International Accreditation Agency for Online Universities Official
Credential Watch Lists ACCTS as suspect agency.
State of Michigan Cites ACCTS as unapproved.
State of Oregon Cites ACCTS as unapproved.

Higher education accreditation
Unrecognized accreditation associations